Robert Mitchell was a 19th-century Member of Parliament from Otago, New Zealand.

In 1864, Mitchell was chosen as one of the wardens for the Hawkesbury district. In 1865, Mitchell was one of the promoters of an Agricultural and Pastoral Association for the Waikouaiti district, covering the same area as the  electorate.

References

Members of the New Zealand House of Representatives
Year of death missing
New Zealand MPs for Dunedin electorates
Year of birth missing
19th-century New Zealand politicians
People from Waikouaiti